Kenneth Grenville Arthur Hair (16 November 1931 – 7 March 1968) was a footballer who played his entire professional career for Leeds United between 1948 and 1964. He later became the manager of Wellington Town and Bradford City. He died of a heart attack, aged 36, after supervising a training session at Bradford City.

Playing career
Grenville Hair was a one-club man playing his entire professional career with Leeds United. He had been signed by manager Major Frank Buckley in 1948, and went on to make 474 appearances for the club as a left-back scoring just two goals. He was an almost ever-present in the Leeds side for ten years until the emergence of Willie Bell and Paul Reaney. In a poll of the 100 greatest ever Leeds United players, he was voted in at number 19.

Managerial career
He stayed with Leeds until 1964, when he took up a player-manager position at Wellington Town. He stayed there until 1967, when he became coach at Bradford City and was soon promoted to the position of manager. He started an upturn in the club's fortunes in his short role as manager before his death, from a heart attack during a training session in March 1968.

He guided City to 11th in Division Four in 1966–67. The following season a run of seven wins from eight games was key to City's position towards the top of the table. On the day of his death, Hair had secured the services of Tony Leighton and Denis Atkins. They proved to be key additions to the squad as the club narrowly missed out on promotion but did so a season later.

Career statistics

As a player

As a manager

References

External links
Nigel's galleries of English football cards 1965-66 to 1979-80

1931 births
1968 deaths
Sportspeople from Burton upon Trent
English footballers
Leeds United F.C. players
English football managers
Bradford City A.F.C. managers
Sport deaths in England
Association football defenders
Association football players who died while playing